The Khalsa Tract Society is an organization created by Bhai Vir Singh in 1894 to promote the aims and objects of the Singh Sabha Movement.

Sikhism in India
Organizations established in 1894
Organisations based in India
1894 establishments in India